The 2008-2009 ABA season was the eighth season of the American Basketball Association that lasted from November 2008 and ended with the championship game in March 2009 between the Kentucky Bisons and the Maywood Buzz. The Kentucky Bisons won their first title after defeating the Buzz, 127–120.

The 2008–2009 season was scheduled to host over 50 teams, but travelling costs doomed most teams and resulted in many franchises folding.

Regular season standings
The following are the final regular season standings of the 2008–2009 season. Some teams folded during the regular season and did not complete all of their scheduled games.

Postseason

References

American Basketball Association (2000–present) seasons
ABA